FM is a British sitcom which aired on ITV2, starring Chris O'Dowd, Kevin Bishop and Nina Sosanya. The series followed the lives of two DJs and their producer on their FM radio programme, "Skin 86.5 FM". The show also featured music from real-life artists and guest stars from the music industry.

The first episode aired on 25 February 2009 and the series ran for 6 episodes. It broadcast on Wednesdays at 22:30.  The series launched with 213,000 viewers. The whole series was re-run on Friday 3 April from 22:00 until 01:00. On 13 April 2009 the series was released on DVD with a BBFC rating of 15.

Cast and characters

 Chris O'Dowd as Lindsay Carol
 Kevin Bishop as Dom Cox
 Nina Sosanya as Jane Edwards
 Ophelia Lovibond as Daisy
 O. T. Fagbenle as Topher Kiefer
 Oliver Lansley as Neil
 Daniel Kaluuya as Ades

Production
A pilot episode was made in 2006 for Channel 4 by Room 5 Productions, with Dean Lennox Kelly, Warwick Davis and Raquel Cassidy in the lead roles. ITV Studios began searching for funding from record companies and radio stations to produce a second series for the show, but to no avail, so only one season was made.

This was the second time O'Dowd played a radio DJ; he had previously done this in the comedy movie The Boat That Rocked.

Episodes
In addition to the title being a theme for each episode, they are also all names of songs; continuing the shows music related subject matter. The songs from each title are "Last Night a DJ Saved My Life" by Indeep, "System Addict" by Five Star, "Return to Sender" by Elvis Presley, "Golden Lady" by Stevie Wonder, "Video Killed the Radio Star" by The Buggles, and "Blinded by the Light" by Manfred Mann's Earth Band.

References

External links

2009 British television series debuts
2009 British television series endings
2000s British sitcoms
ITV sitcoms
Television series about radio